Fred McEvoy may refer to:

 Frederick McEvoy (1907–1951), Australian/British sportsman and socialite
 Fred McEvoy (footballer) (1913–1982), Australian rules footballer
 Frederick McEvoy (cricketer) (1856–1913), Australian cricketer